Petit soeur or Petite sœur may refer to:

 Petite Sœur (1996 film), a 1996 French television film
 "Petite Sœur" (song), a 2005 song by French singer Lââm
 Petite Soeur, Seychelles; an island

See also

 
 Soeur (disambiguation)
 Petit (disambiguation)
 Little Sister (disambiguation)